Brian Alderson (5 May 1950 – 23 April 1997) was a Scottish footballer. He predominantly played as a winger, but was also able to play as a striker.

Alderson, who was born in Dundee, began his career with local youth side Lochee Harp before becoming a professional with Coventry City. Alderson spent five years at Highfield Road, twice finishing as Coventry's top goalscorer, before moving to Leicester City in mid-1975. He spent three years with Leicester, although he was no longer a regular during his final season, 1977–78, owing to injury.

In 1978 Noel Cantwell, who had managed Alderson during his spell at Coventry, invited him to play for the newly formed New England Tea Men of the North American Soccer League. Alderson spent two years at the club before concluding his outdoor career with a two-year spell at the Atlanta Chiefs. He ended his career playing indoor football for the New Jersey Rockets.

References

External links

Alderson's North American statistics at nasljerseys.com

1950 births
1997 deaths
Atlanta Chiefs players
Coventry City F.C. players
Expatriate soccer players in the United States
Association football forwards
Association football wingers
Lochee Harp F.C. players
Leicester City F.C. players
Major Indoor Soccer League (1978–1992) players
North American Soccer League (1968–1984) indoor players
New England Tea Men players
New Jersey Rockets (MISL) players
North American Soccer League (1968–1984) players
Footballers from Dundee
Scottish expatriate footballers
Scottish expatriate sportspeople in the United States
Scottish footballers
Scotland under-23 international footballers